Ladislav Josef Čelakovský (November 29, 1834 – November 24, 1902) was a Czech botanist born in Prague. He was the son of writer František Ladislav Čelakovský, and father to mycologist Ladislav František Čelakovský (1864-1916).

He studied at Charles University in Prague, and from 1860 gave lectures at the National Museum in Prague. In 1880 he attained the chair of botany at the university. In 1877 he became a member of the Königliche Böhmische Gesellschaft der Wissenschaften (Czech Royal Society of Sciences).

Čelakovský conducted extensive research involving classification of plants, particularly studies of regional flora from what is now the Czech Republic. He made important contributions on the morphology and physiology of the reproductive organs of Gymnospermae. He described numerous new botanical species, and has a handful of plants named after him, such as Stipa celakovskyi, Lathyrus celakovskyi and Orchis celakovskyi.

Čelakovský was a supporter of Darwinism.

Selected publications 
 Analytická květena Čech, Moravy a rakouského Slezska (Analysis of flora of Bohemia, Moravia and Austrian Silesia), Prague 1879, 1897. 
 Prodromus květeny české (Prodromus of Czech flora),  Prague 1868-1889. 
 Přírodopisný atlas rostlinstva (Natural historical atlas of vegetation), Prague 1866, 1873 and 1889. 
 Rozpravy o Darwinově theorii (Debates on Darwin's theory),  Prague 1894.

Notes 
 This article is based on a translation of an article from the Czech and German Wikipedia.

References 

1834 births
1902 deaths
Czech botanists
Academic staff of Charles University
Scientists from Prague